Johan Nordahl Brun Rolfsen (12 June 1848 – 18 January 1928) was a Norwegian writer, educationalist and teacher, journalist, translator and speaker. He is best known for the series of five readers for elementary school,  (1892–1895), which became the most widely-used schoolbook in Norway.

Family
Rolfsen was born in Bergen. His parents were merchant and later bank teller Rasmus Rolfsen and Jannikke Brun. He was great-grandson of poet and bishop of Bjørgvin Johan Nordal Brun, and grandson of shipmaster, shipowner and member of the Norwegian Constitutional Assembly Jens Rolfsen. He married Hedevig Martha Hastrup Birch in 1885. He was the father of painter Alf Rolfsen.

Early life
Rolfsen finished his education at Bergen Cathedral School in 1866, and continued his studies in Christiania. He issued the collection of poetry and stories  in 1874. In 1877 he moved to Bergen, working as an instructor at the theatre Den Nationale Scene. During the 1880s he experimented with different literary genres. He edited the children's magazine  from 1885 to 1894. His musical comedy  (1890), with music by Ole Olsen, was a success on stage.

Later life
In 1890 the Rolfsen family moved from Bergen and settled in Kristiania. Rolfsen had sent an application to the Ministry of Church for funding the writing of new readers for elementary school, but his application was refused after a three-day debate in the Parliament of Norway. Instead he received funding from bookseller and publisher Jacob Dybwad. The readers  were issued 1892–1895 (five volumes), and were later reissued numerous times. They would become the standard readers in Norwegian elementary schools until Thorbjørn Egners lesebøker took over in the 1950s.

Rolfsen worked as a full-time writer and editor the rest of his life, and also as a translator, journalist, researcher and speaker. In 1894 he issued . He was editor of the two-volume work  (1900).

Rolfsen was leader of the Norwegian Students' Society, and later chairman of the Norwegian Authors' Union. He was decorated Knight, First Class of the Royal Norwegian Order of St. Olav in 1912.

References

1848 births
1928 deaths
Schoolteachers from Bergen
Writers from Bergen
People educated at the Bergen Cathedral School